The Supreme Court of the Republic of Croatia is the highest court in the country, which ensures the uniform application of laws and equal justice to all.

Judicial system

Courts protect the legal order of the Republic of Croatia as established by the Constitution and law, and provide for the uniform application of law and equal justice for all.

Administration of justice in the Republic of Croatia is carried out by:

 municipal courts,
 county courts,
 commercial courts,
 administrative courts,
 the High Commercial Court of the Republic of Croatia,
 the High Administrative Court of the Republic of Croatia 
 the High Misdemeanour Court of the Republic of Croatia,
 the High Criminal Court of the Republic of Croatia and
 the Supreme Court of the Republic of Croatia.

N.B. Since July 2018 (effective as of 1 January 2019) former misdemeanour courts have become specialized sections within municipal courts (2 misdemeanour courts - in Zagreb and in Split - have been retained as separate courts - the Municipal Misdemeanour Court in Zagreb and the Municipal Misdemeanour Court in Split), also former Municipal Court in Zagreb has been divided into three courts: the Municipal Civil Court in Zagreb, the Municipal Criminal Court in Zagreb and the Municipal Labour Court in Zagreb.

Powers and responsibilities

Supreme Court basic duties:

 ensures the uniform application of law and equal protection of all citizens before the law,
 discusses all important legal issues arising from the court practice
 decides on extraordinary legal remedies against final decisions of all courts in the Republic of Croatia (cassation, criminal revision etc.),
 hears appeals against decisions of county courts rendered in the first instance and, in special cases, hears appeals against decisions of county courts rendered in the second instance, 
 hears appeals against decisions of the High Commercial Court of the Republic of Croatia, the High Administrative Court of the Republic of Croatia, the High Misdemeanour Court of the Republic of Croatia and the High Criminal Court of the Republic of Croatia, and any other court when specified so by the law,
 decides on the conflict of jurisdiction between the courts in the territory of the Republic of Croatia when they have the same immediately superiour court,
 provides for the professional development of judges.

Composition

The President of the Supreme Court is elected and relieved of duty by the Croatian Parliament at the proposal of the President of the Republic and following a prior opinion of the Parliament's Justice Committee and the Plenary Session of the Supreme Court.

Judicial office is permanent, but exceptionally, at assuming the judicial office for the first time, judges are appointed for a five-year term. After the renewal of the appointment, judges assume their duty as permanent.

All judges are appointed by the National Judicial Council and relieves them of judicial duty, as well as decides on their disciplinary responsibility.

A judge can be relieved of judicial office upon:

 self-request
 becoming permanently incapacitated to perform judicial office
 becoming unworthy of the judicial office after being sentenced for a criminal offence 
 a decision of the National Judicial Council due to the commitment of an act of serious infringement of discipline
 when reaching 70 years of age

Presidents of the Supreme Court

References

External links
 Supreme Court of Croatia 
 High Misdemeanour Court of Croatia (currently available only in Croatian)
 High Commercial Court of Croatia (currently available only in Croatian)
 High Administrative Court of Croatia (currently available only in Croatian)

Croatia
Supreme Court
Judiciary of Croatia